Česko Slovenská SuperStar (English: Czech&Slovak SuperStar), shortened to SuperStar in the seventh season, is the joint Czech-Slovak version of Idol series' Pop Idol merged from Česko hledá SuperStar and Slovensko hľadá SuperStar which previous to that had three individual seasons each.
The seventh season aired in autumn 2021 with castings held in Prague and Bratislava. It is broadcast on two channels: TV Nova (Czech Republic) and Markíza (Slovakia) which have also been the broadcast stations for the individual seasons.

Regional auditions
Auditions were held from 21 September 2020. Due to the COVID-19 pandemic all auditions before final jury audition were held online.

Grand selection – TOP 82 
All 82 contestants that made it through auditions were allocated to Lake Mácha in Doksy, Czech Republic. They performed in three groups. The first group were group performances of three or four singers, whilst the second group were contestants with the same song and the third group were contestants who sang solo. 50 contestants progressed through to the next round.

Duets – TOP 50
50 contestants that made it through competed in duets. Every duo performed a song they were given. The superselection took place in an old sewage treatment plant in Prague, Czech Republic.

Semifinal
20 contestants progressed through to the semifinal. Similar to the previous season, the semifinal did not air live. The final 10 acts that made it through to the live shows were selected by the panel of judges.

Top 20

Finalists

Finals
Ten contestants made it through to the live finals. There were only four final live show this season. The 10 finalists consisted of 2 Slovak male singers, 4 Czech male singers, 2 Slovak female singers and 2 Czech female singers. The final live shows were themed and aired weekly. Elimination results were decided by the audience vote and announced live right after the live show. Each week, two contestants were eliminated until the remaining four reached the grand final. The winner was chosen by the public. The grand final aired on December 19 2021.

Top 10

Top 8

Top 6

Top 4 - Grand Final

Top 3 – Grand Final

Top 2 - Grand Final

Elimination chart

Contestants who appeared on other seasons/shows
 Adam Pavlovčin competed on the first season of The Voice when he was 15 years old. He joined Team Dara Rolins and was eliminated in the Battle round.
 Nikolas Bitkovskij was a contestant in Česko Slovenská Superstar 2018 where he was eliminated before semifinal.

Guest performances

Notes

References

External links 
Official Czech homepage hosted by Nova
Official Slovak homepage hosted by Markíza

Season 07
2010s Czech television series
2010s Slovak television series
2021 Czech television seasons